Mikołaj Gomółka (c. 1535 – after 30 April 1591, most probably 5 March 1609) was a Polish Renaissance composer, and member of the royal court of Sigismund II Augustus, where he was a singer, flutist and trumpeter.

Gomółka was born in Sandomierz. Between 1545 and 1563 he stayed at the royal court, where he learned to play the flute, the 'sztort' (an old Polish wind instrument, prototype of the bassoon), the violin and the lute, and then he became a royal chapel musician with full rights. Having left the court he fulfilled various social and legal functions in Sandomierz; for some time he stayed at the court of the Kraków bishop Piotr Myszkowski (to whom he dedicated his work "Melodies for the Polish Psalter"); he conducted mining researches near Muszyna and also stayed at the court of Jan Zamoyski in Kraków, where he was still living on 30 April 1591; this is the last known date of his life.

The only preserved work by Gomółka is a collection of 150 independent compositions to the text of David's Psalter by Jan Kochanowski, for four-part unaccompanied mixed choir. The music is fully subordinated to the contents and the expressive layer of the text; he illustrates the mood or particular words by means of musical devices. In some works the composer applies dance rhythms characteristic of canzonetta. The "Melodies for the Polish Psalter" are a valuable monument of Old Polish culture showing the lay achievements of the Renaissance adapted to the Polish conditions.

Music
"Melodies for the Polish Psalter" ("Melodiae na Psałterz polski"") of Mikołaj Gomółka was recorded in 1996 on CD by early music Warsaw Music Society's medieval instruments ensemble -Ars Nova and vocal ensemble Il Canto. CD got award of the Polish music industry Fryderyk in category of early music in 1996.

References

External links
 Works by Mikołaj Gomółka in National Digital Library of Poland (Polona)

Renaissance composers
1530s births
1609 deaths
Polish composers
People from Sandomierz
People from Yazlovets
Polish male classical composers